The following highways are numbered 32B:

United States
 Hawaii Route 32B
 County Road 32B (Levy County, Florida)
 New York State Route 32B (former)
 County Route 32B (Suffolk County, New York)